A high-capacity magazine ban is a law which bans or otherwise restricts high-capacity magazines, detachable firearm magazines that can hold more than a certain number of rounds of ammunition. For example, in the United States, the now-expired Federal Assault Weapons Ban of 1994 included limits regarding magazines that could hold more than ten rounds. As of 2022, twelve U.S. states, and a number of local governments, ban or regulate magazines that they have legally defined as high-capacity.  The majority of states do not ban or regulate any magazines on the basis of capacity.  States that do have large capacity magazine bans or restrictions typically do not apply to firearms with fixed magazines whose capacity would otherwise exceed the large capacity threshold.

The federal ban which was in effect from 1994 to 2004 defined a magazine capable of holding more than 10 rounds of ammunition as a large capacity ammunition feeding device. Likewise, the state of California defines a large capacity magazine as "any ammunition feeding device with a capacity to accept more than 10 rounds." Such devices are commonly called high-capacity magazines. Among states with bans, the maximum capacity is 10 to 20 rounds. Several municipalities, such as New York City, restrict magazine capacity to 5 rounds for rifles and shotguns.

Magazine bans by country

Canada
With the passage of Bill C-17 in 1993 under Prime Minister Kim Campbell (in response to the 1989 Ecole Polytechnique Massacre), magazines designed for use in semi-automatic centrefire rifles and semi-automatic shotguns became limited to five rounds, and magazines designed for use in handguns are limited to 10 rounds. Magazines designed for use in semi-automatic rimfire rifles, as well as manually operated long guns, are exempt from the magazine capacity restrictions.

In recent years, there has been a growing trend of ways to legally work around the magazine capacity restrictions. Numerous semi-automatic centrefire rifles also happen to accept handgun magazines, thereby legally increasing magazine capacity. Numerous rifle and handgun magazines designed for a particular caliber also happen to fit an over-the-limit number of smaller caliber rounds, also legally increasing magazine capacity.

Russia
In Russia, all magazines for use with any type of firearm are limited to no more than 10 rounds.

United Kingdom

There are no capacity restrictions on detachable magazines in the United Kingdom.

Rifles & Pistols
High-capacity magazines may be used in any legal rifle or long-barrelled pistol. However, magazines larger than 10-25rounds are rare outside of specific target events such as mini-rifle and Practical shooting matches.

The topic is somewhat academic as semi-automatic rifles (other than in .22-caliber rimfire) and the majority of handguns are prohibited in Great Britain. Most legally-available firearms are unsuited to high capacities (e.g. repeating bolt-action rifles).

Pistols may be legally held in Northern Ireland, and there is no restriction on magazine capacity.

Shotguns
Since January 1989 any shotgun with a detachable magazine, or a non-detachable magazine capable of holding more than two cartridges is classed as a Section 1 firearm and must be held on a Firearm Certificate, which is subject to more stringent requirements than "normal" Section 2 shotguns held on a Shotgun Certificate. Section 2 shotguns include break-barrel guns with no magazine, as well as repeating and semi-automatic guns with fixed two-round magazines. When the 1988 Act was introduced, many guns with larger (often tubular magazines) were brought into compliance by crimping the magazine.

United States

Federal Assault Weapons Ban of 1994

William B. Ruger, a founder of Sturm, Ruger & Co., is often ascribed with providing the impetus for high capacity magazine restrictions.  Ruger proposed that instead of banning firearms, Congress should outlaw magazines holding more than 15 rounds. Ruger told Tom Brokaw of NBC News in 1992 that "No honest man needs more than 10 rounds in any gun". On March 30, 1989, Ruger sent a letter to every member of the US Congress stating:

The Federal Assault Weapons Ban of 1994 included a ban on magazines capable of holding more than ten rounds of ammunition. The Public Safety and Recreational Firearms Use Protection Act, commonly called the assault weapons ban (AWB), was enacted in September 1994. The ban, including its ban on magazines capable of holding more than ten rounds of ammunition, became defunct (expired) in September 2004 per a sunset provision. Attempts to renew the ban have failed on the federal level.

State high-capacity magazine bans

A number of U.S. states as well as Washington, D.C. have high-capacity magazine restrictions or bans.
California (on in-state sales of magazines with a capacity of more than 10 rounds)
Colorado (on in-state sales of magazines with a capacity of more than 15 rounds)
Connecticut
Delaware 
Hawaii (on handguns only)
Illinois (10 rounds for rifles or shotguns, 15 rounds for handguns)
Maryland (on in-state sales of magazines with a capacity of more than 10 rounds)
Massachusetts
New Jersey
New York
Rhode Island
Vermont (10-round magazine limit on rifles and a 15-round limit on handguns)
Washington (on sale, manufacture, and importation of magazines with a capacity of more than 10 rounds, but possession is legal)
In Virginia, high-capacity magazines, which are defined as being over 20 rounds for a semi-automatic, centerfire rifle or pistol, and over 7 shells for a shotgun, are not in and of themselves banned, but using one in combination with a firearm changes its status to an "assault firearm" which is prohibited for foreign nationals without permanent residence to possess, as well as requiring a license to carry in certain counties and cities.

Municipal and county high-capacity magazine bans
U.S. cities with high-capacity magazine restrictions or bans include: 
Denver, Colorado
Cook County, Illinois
Aurora, Illinois
Chicago, Illinois
Oak Park, Illinois
Albany, New York
Buffalo, New York
New York, New York
Rochester, New York

Legal status
Challenges to high-capacity magazine bans raised by the National Rifle Association of America (NRA) and other groups have been unsuccessful. The constitutionality of high-capacity magazine bans has been repeatedly upheld by the courts, including the U.S. Courts of Appeals for the First Circuit, Second Circuit, Third Circuit, Fourth Circuit, Seventh Circuit, Ninth Circuit, and D.C. Circuit. However, after the Supreme Court's decision in Bruen invalidated the means-end scrutiny used in these decisions, new litigation against these bans is ongoing.

Public opinion

In 2012 62% of Americans favored banning the sale of high-capacity ammunition magazines, according to a Gallup poll with a margin of error of ±4%. In 2017, 65% of American adults supported banning high-capacity magazines, according to a Pew Research Center survey with an error attributable to sampling of  ±2.8% at the 95% level of confidence. In late February – early March 2018, after the Stoneman Douglas High School shooting, 63% of American adults supported a ban on the sale and possession of high-capacity or extended ammunition magazines, according to a CNN poll with a margin of error of ±3.7%. 73% of American adults supported banning high-capacity ammunition magazines that hold more than 10 rounds, according to an NPR/Ipsos poll with a margin of error of ±3.5%. 70% of registered voters supported banning high-capacity magazines, according to a Politico/Morning Consult poll with a margin of error ±2%.

Hunting
Some jurisdictions apply magazine limits to hunters. For example, Maine and Oregon have a 5-cartridge limit on auto-loading firearms for hunting.

Impact

On gun homicide rates and lethality
A 2004 study examining the effects of the Federal Assault Weapons Ban in effect from 1994 to 2004 which included a prohibition on sales of magazines with over ten rounds.  The study found that the ban was effective at reducing crimes committed with assault weapons, though less than 2% of gun murders in the U.S. are committed with assault weapons. The ban was not associated with a reduction in firearm homicides or the lethality of gun crimes in general.  The authors suggest this may be due to the concurrent rise in use of non-banned semiautomatic weapons with large capacity magazines.  The authors note that high-capacity magazines have a greater potential for affecting gun crime as compared to assault weapons due to the fact that high-capacity magazines are used in firearms not classified as assault weapons.  The authors further note, "However, it is not clear how often the ability to fire more than 10 shots without reloading (the current magazine capacity limit) affects the outcomes of gun attacks." 95% of gun murders involve three or fewer shots fired. Overall the authors reported that "there has been no discernible reduction in the lethality and injuriousness of gun violence, based on indicators like the percentage of gun crimes resulting in death or the share of gunfire incidents resulting in injury, as we might have expected had the ban reduced crimes with both AWs and LCMs."

A 2019 study found no statistically significant association between state-level LCM bans and homicide rates.

A 2020 RAND Corporation review indicated that there were few methodologically rigorous studies on the impact of LCM bans on violent crime rates, and concluded that "High-capacity magazine bans have uncertain effects on firearm homicides. Evidence for the effect of high-capacity magazine bans on firearm homicides is also inconclusive."

On mass shooting rates and lethality

A 2019 study examined the effect of large-capacity magazine (LCM) bans on the frequency and lethality of "high-lethality mass shootings" (defined as those resulting in six or more fatalities) in the United States from 1990 to 2017. Of the 69 high-fatality mass shootings in the U.S. over that period, at least 44 (64%) involved LCMs. Attacks involving LCMs "resulted in a 62% higher mean average death toll" than mass shootings in which high-capacity magazines were not used. States which had banned high-capacity magazines had a substantially lower incidence of mass shootings, as well as far fewer fatalities in mass shootings: "The incidence of high-fatality mass shootings in non–LCM ban states was more than double the rate in LCM ban states; the annual number of deaths was more than 3 times higher." The study acknowledged that because 69 incidents over a 28-year period was, for statistical purposes, "a relatively small number and limits the power to detect significant associations," it was possible that the magnitude of the effects detected was overestimated. The study authors "did not have the statistical power (and thus did not even try) to determine whether different aspects of the various LCM laws might have differential effects on the incidence of high-fatality mass shootings."

A 2020 study, examining fatal mass shootings in the U.S. for the period 1984–2017, found that, when controlling for other variables, LCM bans, and handgun purchaser licensing laws, were associated with a significant reduction in fatal mass shootings, while assault weapon bans, background checks, and de-regulation of civilian concealed carry were not.

See also

 Assault weapons legislation in the United States
 Gun laws in the United States by state
 Gun politics in the United States
 Bullet button

References

Further reading

Large Capacity Magazines - summary of U.S. state laws from the Giffords Law Center to Prevent Gun Violence
 
 
 
 

Gun politics in the United States
United States firearms law